Douglas Schwartz is an American television screenwriter and series creator who, along with Michael Berk, worked as a writer on the television series Manimal, and multiple made for television movies. He is most famous for creating co-producing, and writing The Wizard, as well as creating and writing the earlier scripts of Baywatch, a series which exceeded a global audience of 1 billion people. He also developed Sheena, based on the comic book of the same name.

Douglas Schwartz is a nephew of Sherwood Schwartz, who created the TV show Gilligan's Island.

Screenwriting credits

Television
Manimal (1983)
The Wizard (1986-1987)
Baywatch (1989-1992)
Thunder in Paradise (1994)
Sheena (2000)

Film
Goldie and the Boxer (1979)
The Incredible Journey of Doctor Meg Laurel (1979)
The Last Song (1980)
The Wild and the Free (1980)
The Ordeal of Dr. Mudd (1980)
The Haunting Passion (1983)
Crime of Innocence (1985)
Baywatch: Panic at Malibu Pier (1989)
Assault on Devil’s Island (1997)
Steel Chariots (1997)
Shadow Warriors II: Hunt for the Death Merchant (1999)
Cabin Pressure (2002)
Baywatch: Hawaiian Wedding (2003)
Soul Surfer (2011)

Co-creator
The Wizard (1986-1987)
Baywatch (1989-2001)
Thunder in Paradise (1994)
Baywatch Nights (1995-1997)
Sheena (2000-2002)

Producer

Television
Manimal (1983)
The Wizard (1986-1987)
Baywatch (1989-1999)
Thunder in Paradise (1994)
Baywatch Nights (1995)
Higher Ground (2000)
Sheena (2000-2001)

Film
The Ordeal of Dr. Mudd (1980)
The Wild and the Free (1980)
The Haunting Passion (1983)
Crime of Innocence (1985)
Baywatch: Panic at Malibu Pier (1989)
Steel Chariots (1997)
Assault on Devil’s Island (1997)
Shadow Warriors II: Hunt for the Death Merchant (1999)
Baywatch: Hawaiian Wedding (2003)
Soul Surfer (2011)
Baywatch (2017)

References

External links

The Wizard Official Fansite & Definitive Cyberhome

American television writers
American male television writers
Living people
Year of birth missing (living people)